The CONMEBOL Libertadores Fútbol Playa is an annual continental beach soccer club competition, organized by the governing body for football in South America, CONMEBOL, founded in 2016.

Since 2017, the tournament is contested between the top-level domestic league/championship champions from each of the ten South American nations which are members of CONMEBOL. The reigning champions and an additional club from the host country also take part, taking the total number of participants to twelve. It is therefore the premier club beach soccer championship in South America, the winners becoming continental champions.

It is beach soccer's version of the better known Copa Libertadores in association football. Comparatively, in beach soccer, it is South America's version of Europe's Euro Winners Cup.

Brazilian club Vasco da Gama are the current champions and most successful team with three titles.

Results

Performance

By club

By nation

See also
Copa Libertadores de Futsal
Mundialito de Clubes

References

External links
CONMEBOL, official website (in Spanish)
Beach Soccer Worldwide, official website
Copa Libertadores, at beachsoccerrussia.ru (in Russian)

 
Beach soccer competitions
CONMEBOL club competitions
Multi-national professional sports leagues